The 1981 FIA European Formula 3 Championship was the seventh edition of the FIA European Formula 3 Championship. The championship consisted of 14 rounds across the continent. The season was won by Italian Mauro Baldi, with Alain Ferté second and Philippe Alliot in third.

Calendar

Results

Championship standings

Drivers' championship

References

External links 

1981 in motorsport
FIA European Formula 3 Championship